Rado Rasoanaivo (born 14 November 1969) is a retired Malagasy professional footballer.

International goals 
Scores and results list Madagascar's goal tally first, score column indicates score after each Madagascar goal.

References

1969 births
Living people
Malagasy footballers
AS Excelsior players
Association football midfielders
Malagasy expatriate footballers
Expatriate footballers in Mauritius
Malagasy expatriate sportspeople in Mauritius
Expatriate footballers in Réunion
Malagasy expatriate sportspeople in Réunion
Madagascar international footballers